Franciszek Walicki (20 July 1921 – 3 October 2015) was a Polish journalist. He was considered the father of Polish beat and rock music, calling them big-beat as rock and roll was unacceptable name for the authorities of the Polish People's Republic at the time.

In 1956 he and Leopold Tyrmand organized the first Jazz Festival in Sopot. Walicki also founded a number of important Polish bands:
1959 – Rhythm and Blues – the first Polish big beat group
1960 – Czerwono-Czarni
1962 – Niebiesko-Czarni
1968 – Breakout
1974 – SBB

Awards and distinctions
1996 – Officer's Cross of the Order of Polonia Restituta
Righteous among the Nations medal
1998 – Grand Prix, National Festival of Polish Song in Opole

References

External links
Official website

1921 births
2015 deaths
Musicians from Łódź
Polish journalists
Writers from Łódź
People from Łódź Voivodeship (1919–1939)
Officers of the Order of Polonia Restituta
Polish Righteous Among the Nations
Recipients of the Gold Medal for Merit to Culture – Gloria Artis